Academic ranks in China are the titles, relative importance and power of professors, researchers, and administrative personnel held in academia.

Overview
Most universities in the People's Republic of China adopt a four-level academic rank system (Senior rank, Vice-Senior rank, Medium rank, and Junior rank), i.e. Professor, Associate professor, Lecturer, and Assistant lecturer. More recently, some top universities (e.g. Tsinghua University, Peking University, Shanghai Jiao Tong University) also added the American-style title of assistant professor, typically granted to tenure-track positions, with the expectation that they will be promoted to Associate professor (tenured or untenured) and then full professor (tenured) within the academic tenure system.

Most PhD graduates will initially be appointed at the lecturer level and receive the qualification to be promoted to associate professorship after several years of teaching. However, people holding a doctorate from Western universities and with some working experience overseas will occasionally be appointed at a higher level, in exceptional cases at the full professor level directly. Mostly, each individuate institute has only one principal rank (e.g. dean of a college, president of a university) and multiple deputy ranks.

Four-level academic rank in different series (Senior rank, Vice-Senior rank, Medium rank, and Junior rank)
Professor series 
 Professor (Senior rank)
 Associate Professor (Vice-Senior rank)
 Lecturer (Medium rank) or Assistant Professor (American-style title) (Chinese: 助理教授)
 Assistant Lecturer, or Associate Lecturer (Junior rank)
Engineer series
 Professor-level senior engineer (Senior rank)
 Senior engineer (Vice-Senior rank)
 Engineer (Medium rank) 
 Assistant Engineer (Junior rank)
Researcher series
 Researcher (Senior rank)
 Associate researcher (Vice-Senior rank)
 Assistant researcher (Medium rank)
 Intern researcher (Junior rank)

Academic trainee
 Postdoctoral research fellow ( Chinese: 博士后研究员) and research fellow/researcher ( Chinese:研究员)
 Research assistant ( Chinese:研究助理) and teaching assistant ( Chinese:教学助理/助教)
 Doctoral student ( Chinese:博士研究生)
 Master student ( Chinese:硕士研究生)
 Undergraduate student ( Chinese:本科生)

Honorary titles
 Academician, a person who was nominated as a member of Chinese Academy of Engineering or/and Chinese Academy of Sciences
 Emeritus Professor
 Honorary Professor, usually awarded to academics with important social contributions
 Distinguished Professor, usually awarded to academics with a recognized achievement in research
 Guest professor, or commonly visiting professor, usually awarded to distinguished visiting scholars

Administrative ranks

 Secretary of the CPC Committee, similar to Chancellor, who usually does not take administrative responsibilities
 Associate Secretary of the CPC Committee, similar to Vice-Chancellor; the 1st order Associate Secretary is usually appointed President, with other Associate Secretaries being the Vice-President
 President, taking the major decision for academic and administrative affairs, assisted by Vice-Presidents
 Vice-president, usually taking the responsibility of a certain area, e.g. academic, administrative, facilities, finance, etc.
 Dean
 Deputy dean or associate dean of schools and faculties
 Director of research centre and director of academic department

References

Academic ranks
Education in China
Ranks